Sideroxylon is a Greek term meaning "iron wood" and may refer to:
Sideroxylon, a genus of flowering plants in the family Sapotaceae
Eucalyptus sideroxylon, also called Mugga, Red Ironbark or Mugga Ironbark, a small to medium-sized or occasionally tall Australian tree
 Sideroxylon (oxymoron), a type of oxymoron
 Occasionally used for petrified wood
 A 1983 album by The Celibate Rifles